The Sweet Corn Festival is an annual event that takes place in throughout the Midwest on the weekend before schools resume session during the summer months. The festivals sell a variety of merchandise, from corn on the cob and other food sold by vendors as well as stalls that sell anything from jewelry to CDs. Some of the vendors come from out of state to set up their stalls for the festival. The event also hosts live music performed by local bands and artists.
Locations that have Sweet Corn Festivals include: West Point, Iowa, Sun Prairie, Wisconsin, Adel, Iowa, Cedar Rapids, Iowa, Chatham, Illinois, and Hoopeston, Illinois.

The Hoopeston National Sweetcorn Festival has been a continuous festival since 1938. The Hoopeston Jaycees have been the main sponsor for over 70 Years. The Festival includes many of the activities mentioned above, as well as a pageant called "The National Sweetheart Pageant"  which is officially sanctioned by the Miss America Pageant.  Eight contestants from the NSP have become Miss America! Citing a contract change within the Miss America Organization, contestants will no longer be able to participate in both pageants.

The festival does not charge for sweetcorn, but rather gives away more than 50 tons of corn each year. The corn is cooked onsight at Cole Titterington Park in Hoopeston, just off Route 1 by the steam generated from a vintage steam engine that was once used in the fields surrounding Hoopeston.

That festival was cancelled between 1942–47, and 2020.

References

External links

History of the National Sweetcorn Festival

Summer festivals
Fairborn, Ohio
Tourist attractions in Greene County, Ohio
Festivals in Ohio
Festivals in Iowa
Festivals in Wisconsin